Shifting Sands is a 1918 American silent drama film directed by Albert Parker and starring Gloria Swanson. Prints of the film are held by the George Eastman House Motion Picture Collection and in private collections, and Shifting Sands has been released on DVD.

Plot
As described in a film magazine, Marcia Grey (Swanson), a struggling artist, is accused of theft by Heinrich Von Holtz, and is sent to Blackwell's Island for ninety days. Out in the world again, she joins the Salvation Army. John Stanford (King), a wealthy philanthropist, gives an outing to poor children in her care. He tells her that he loves her and they are married. Five years of married life pass and the Great War breaks out. Stanford becomes a secret service agent. Heinrich Von Holtz, now a spy, visits the Stanford home in the guise of an Englishman. He recognizes Mrs. Stanford and tells her that she must obtain a government document from her husband or be exposed. She consents and goes with him to the enemy headquarters, carrying the document. The document proves spurious and Marcia, laughingly defiant, declares she would not betray her country for any price. Secret service men break in just as Mrs. Stanford's life is threatened. John Stanford, who had been compelled to suspect his wife of treachery and infidelity, learns that she has been in the secret service as well as himself. The film ends with the couple reunited and Marcia holding her secret.

Cast
 Gloria Swanson as Marcia Grey
 Joe King as John Stanford
 Harvey Clark as Henry Holt - Rent collector
 Leone Carton as Cora Grey
 Lillian Langdon as Mrs. Stanford
 Arthur Millett as Major Willis

References

External links

 available for download at Internet Archive

1918 films
1918 drama films
Silent American drama films
American silent feature films
American black-and-white films
Films directed by Albert Parker
Triangle Film Corporation films
1910s American films